Hao Wei (born 27 December 1976) is a Chinese football coach and former international footballer. He is the manager of the Chinese Super League side Shandong Luneng.

Player career

Club career
As with many of the most promising youth players from China, Hao Wei was sent to Brazil for a training programme sponsored by Jianlibao in 1997 with fellow youth prospects Li Tie and Zhang Xiaorui. When he returned to start his professional football career he would join Shandong Luneng in 1998, however he found it difficult to immediately break into the team due to injury, though he was able to play in 11 league games and score 1 goal. It was not until the 1999 league season that Hao Wei would rise to prominence when he established himself as Shandong's first choice right back and help them to a league and cup double. His importance to the Shandong team would quickly fade when new manager Valeri Nepomniachi preferred the emerging Jiao Zhe as his first choice right back and by the end of 2002 league season Hao Wei was allowed to leave.

Hao Wei would join Shanxi Guoli at the beginning of the 2003 league season where despite being an immediate  regular for the team he was unable to help them in their relegation battle to remain in the top tier. Unable to hold on to Hao Wei, Shanxi Guoli would allow him to leave the club for Beijing Guoan at the beginning of the 2004 league season where he would fight for the right back position with Zhang Shuai for the next two seasons before going to Changsha Ginde where he ended his playing career.

International career
Hao Wei would make his senior debut in a friendly against Hong Kong on April 25, 2000 in a 1–0 win. He would play in  another friendly in preparation for the 2000 AFC Asian Cup, however when the squad was chosen for the tournament he was unable to be included. With the emergence of Xu Yunlong and Sun Jihai as the preferred options at right back Hao Wei saw his playing time severely limited. He was brought in to play a Fifa World Cup Qualifier on September 8, 2004 against Malaysia in a 1–0 win, however this was to prove to be his last game.

Management career

After he retired his playing career with Changsha Ginde he would take an assistant management position with them. This was a position he held on to until October 12, 2009 when the Changsha Ginde head coach Zhu Bo was sacked and he was named as the new head coach to replace him. Under his reign he would guide the club from away relegation, however the following season he was unable to improve the teams' performances and on 16 June 2010, Hao became the assistant coach to Serbian manager Miodrag Ješić. Hao would soon leave Changsha to take up a position within the Chinese Women team, however when they were unable to qualify for the Football at the 2012 Summer Olympics and the manager Li Xiaopeng resigned, which saw Hao promoted. Hao was banned from the national team's round of 16 match at the 2015 FIFA Women's World Cup because he interfered with a New Zealand player during his team's last group stage match.

Honours

Player
Shandong Luneng
Chinese Jia-A League: 1999
Chinese FA Cup: 1999

Manager
Shandong Taishan
Chinese Super League: 2021

References

External links

Playing stats at sohu.com
Profile and news at Sina.com

1976 births
Living people
Sportspeople from Zibo
Chinese football managers
Chinese footballers
Footballers from Shandong
China international footballers
Shandong Taishan F.C. players
Beijing Guoan F.C. players
Changsha Ginde players
Chinese Super League players
Association football defenders
China women's national football team managers
2015 FIFA Women's World Cup managers
Guangzhou F.C. non-playing staff
Shandong Taishan F.C. non-playing staff